SpaceX CRS-1, also known as SpX-1, was SpaceX's first operational cargo mission to the International Space Station, under their Commercial Resupply Services (CRS-1) contract with NASA. It was the third flight for the uncrewed Dragon cargo spacecraft, and the fourth overall flight for the company's two-stage Falcon 9 launch vehicle. The launch occurred on 8 October 2012 at 00:34:07 UTC.

History 
In May 2012, it was reported that the Falcon 9 had been transported to Cape Canaveral (CCAFS). The Dragon CRS-1 arrived on 14 August 2012. On 31 August 2012, a wet dress rehearsal (WDR) was completed for the Falcon 9, and on 29 September 2012, a static fire test was completed; both of these tests were completed without the Dragon capsule attached to the launch vehicle stack. The mission passed its Launch Readiness Review (LRR) on 5 October 2012.

The launch occurred on 8 October 2012 at 00:34:07 UTC and successfully placed the Dragon spacecraft into the proper orbit for arriving at the International Space Station with cargo resupply several days later. During the launch, one of the nine engines suffered a sudden loss of pressure 79 seconds into the flight, and an immediate early shutdown of that engine occurred; debris could be seen in the telescopic video of the night launch. The remaining eight engines fired for a longer period of time and the flight control software adjusted the trajectory to insert Dragon into a near-flawless orbit.

Mission timeline

Flight day 1, launch (8 October 2012) 

The mission plan, as published by NASA before the mission, called for the Falcon 9 to reach supersonic speed at 70 seconds after liftoff, and pass through the area of maximum aerodynamic pressure, "max Q" — the point when mechanical stress on the launch vehicle peaks due to a combination of the velocity and resistance created by the Atmosphere of Earth — 10 seconds later. The remaining engines were planned to cut off shortly after — an event known as main-engine cutoff (MECO). Five seconds after MECO, the first and second stages separate. Seven seconds later, the second stage's single Merlin vacuum engine was projected to ignite to begin a 6-minute, 14-second burn to put Dragon into low Earth orbit. Forty seconds after second-stage ignition, Dragon's protective nose cone, which covers Dragon's berthing mechanism, was planned to be jettisoned. At the 9-minute 14-second mark after launch, the second-stage engine was scheduled to cut off (SECO). Thirty-five seconds later, Dragon was planned to separate from Falcon 9's second stage and reach its preliminary orbit. The dragon would, per plan, then deploy its solar panels and open its guidance and navigation control (GNC) bay door which holds the sensors necessary for rendezvous and Dragon's grapple fixture.

Flight day 2 (9 October) 
The mission plan called for the Dragon spacecraft to perform a coelliptic burn that would place it in a circular coelliptic orbit.

Flight day 3 (10 October) 
As Dragon chased the International Space Station (ISS), the spacecraft established Ultra high frequency (UHF) communications using its COTS Ultra-high-frequency Communication Unit (CUCU). Also, using the crew command panel (CCP) on board the station, the expedition crew monitored the approach. This ability for the crew to send commands to Dragon is important during the rendezvous and departure phases of the mission.

During the final approach to the station, a go/no-go was performed by Mission Control Houston and the SpaceX team in Hawthorne to allow Dragon to perform another engine burn that brought it  from the station. At this distance, Dragon began using its close-range guidance systems, composed of LIDAR and thermal imagers. These systems confirmed that Dragon's position and velocity are accurate by comparing the LIDAR image that Dragon receives against Dragon's thermal imagers. The Dragon flight control team in Hawthorne, with assistance from the NASA flight control team at the Johnson Space Center's International Space Station Flight Control Room, commanded the spacecraft to approach the station from its hold position. After another go/no-go was performed by the Houston and Hawthorne teams, Dragon was permitted to enter the Keep-Out Sphere (KOS), an imaginary sphere drawn  around the station that reduces the risk of collision. Dragon proceeded to a position  from the station and was automatically held. Another go/no-go was completed. Then Dragon proceeded to the  position — the capture point. A final go/no-go was performed, and the Mission Control Houston team notified the crew they were go for the capture of Dragon.

At that point, Expedition 33 crewmember Akihiko Hoshide of the Japan Aerospace Exploration Agency used the station's  robotic arm, known as Canadarm2, reached for and grappled the Dragon spacecraft at 10:56 UTC. Hoshide, with the help of Expedition 33 Commander Sunita Williams of NASA, guided Dragon to the Earth-facing side of the station's Harmony module. Williams and Hoshide swapped places and Williams gently berthed Dragon to Harmony's Common Berthing Mechanism at 13:03 UTC. The opening of the hatch between Dragon and the Harmony module, which was originally not scheduled to occur until 11 October 2012, was moved up and occurred at 17:40 UTC.

Remainder of mission (11 to 28 October) 

Over a period of two and a half weeks, the ISS crew unloaded Dragon's payload and reloaded it with cargo for return to Earth.

After its mission at the orbital laboratory was completed, newly arrived Expedition 33 Flight Engineer Kevin Ford used the Canadarm2 robotic arm to detach Dragon from Harmony, maneuver it out to the  release point, and release the vehicle. The Dragon then performed a series of three burns to place it on a trajectory away from the station. Approximately six hours after Dragon departed the station, it conducted a deorbit burn, which lasted up to 10 minutes. The Dragon's trunk, which contains its solar arrays, have then be jettisoned.

The landing was controlled by automatic firing of its Draco thrusters during the atmospheric reentry. Even if Dragon were to lose one of its main parachutes, the two remaining chutes would still permit a safe landing. SpaceX uses a  boat equipped with an A-frame and an articulating crane, a  crew boat for telemetry operations, and two  rigid-hull inflatable boats to perform recovery operations. Onboard are approximately a dozen SpaceX engineers and technicians as well as a four-person dive team. Once the Dragon capsule splashed down, the recovery team secured the vehicle and then placed it on deck for the journey back to shore.

SpaceX technicians opened the side hatch of the vehicle and retrieved the time-critical items. The critical cargo items were placed on a fast-boat for the  trip back to California for eventual return to NASA that then took care of the precious science cargo and handle the post-flight analysis of the samples. The rest of the cargo was unloaded once the Dragon capsule reached SpaceX's test facility in McGregor, Texas.

Payload

Primary payload 

The Dragon returned  of cargo,  without packaging.

Secondary payload 
For some months prior to the launch, a  prototype second-generation Orbcomm-G2 satellite was planned to be launched as a secondary payload from Falcon 9's second stage. Although the secondary payload made it to the Dragon insertion orbit, an engine anomaly on one of the nine engines on the Falcon 9 first stage during the ascent resulted in automatic engine shutdown and a longer first-stage burn on the remaining eight engines to complete orbital insertion while subsequently increasing use of propellant over the nominal mission.

The primary payload contractor, NASA, requires a greater-than-99% estimated probability that the stage of any secondary payload on a similar orbital inclination to the International Space Station will reach their orbital altitude goal above the station. Due to the engine failure, the Falcon 9 used more propellant than intended, reducing the success probability estimate to approximately 95%. Because of this, the second stage did not attempt a second burn, and Orbcomm-G2 was left in an unusable orbit  and burned up in Earth's atmosphere within 4 days after the launch.

Both SpaceX and Orbcomm were aware, prior to the mission, of the high risk that the secondary payload satellite could remain at the lower altitude of the Dragon insertion orbit, and that was a risk that Orbcomm agreed to take given the dramatically lower cost of launch for a secondary payload.

Launch attempts

Falcon 9 engine anomaly 

During the ascent, 79 seconds after launch, an engine anomaly occurred with one of the nine engines on the Falcon 9 first stage. SpaceX has emphasized for several years that the Falcon 9 first stage is designed for "engine out" capability, with the capability to shut down one or more malfunctioning engines and still make a successful ascent. In the event, the SpaceX CRS-1's first stage shut down Engine no. 1, and as a result continued the first-stage burn on the remaining eight engines longer than usual at a somewhat reduced thrust to insert the Dragon spacecraft into the proper orbit. Although unintended, this was the first inflight demonstration of Falcon 9's "engine out" design, and "provides a clear demonstration of the engine out capability".

In response to the anomaly, NASA and SpaceX jointly formed the CRS-1 Post-Flight Investigation Board. Preliminary information from the post-flight review board indicates that the Engine no. 1 fuel dome, above the nozzle, ruptured but did not explode. The burning fuel that exited before the engine was shut down caused the fairing rupture, as seen in the flight video recordings. Subsequent investigations revealed in a Congressional hearing pinpointed the issue as a result of an undetected material flaw in the engine chamber jacket, likely introduced during engine production. During flight, the data suggests this material flaw ultimately developed into a breach in the main combustion chamber. This breach released a jet of hot gas and fuel in the direction of the main fuel line causing a secondary leak and ultimately a rapid drop in engine pressure. As a result, the flight computer commanded shutdown of Engine no. 1 and Falcon 9 continued on its path to ensure Dragon's entry into orbit for subsequent rendezvous and berthing with the ISS.

See also 

 List of Falcon 9 launches

References

External links 

 SpaceX CRS-1 NASA page
 SpaceX CRS-1 Mission Press Kit (4 October 2012)
 Video of Static Fire test. YouTube (spacexchannel)
 Video of Launch. YouTube (spacexchannel)
 Video of Approach, Grappling and Berthing of Dragon. YouTube (ReelNASA)
 Video of Hatch Opening. YouTube (NASA TV)
 Video of Dragon Splashdown. YouTube (spacexchannel)

SpaceX Dragon
Spacecraft launched in 2012
Spacecraft which reentered in 2012
SpaceX payloads contracted by NASA
Supply vehicles for the International Space Station
Articles containing video clips